Aliabad-e Qadiri (also romanized as ‘Alīābād-e Qadīrī; also known as ‘Alīābād) is a village in Aliabad Rural District, in the Central District of Anbarabad County, Kerman Province, Iran. At the 2006 census, its population was 1,635, in 361 families.

References 

Populated places in Anbarabad County